Brooke Morrison (born 3 January 1979 in New South Wales) is a retired female field hockey striker from Australia. She made her debut for the Australian women's national team during the 1998 season following an impressive season with the Australian U21 team at the 1997 Junior World Cup. Nicknamed Brooko she was a member of the Hockeyroos at the 2002 Commonwealth Games in Manchester, where the team placed third in the rankings.

References
 Profile Australia Hockey

1979 births
Living people
Australian female field hockey players
Field hockey players at the 2002 Commonwealth Games
Commonwealth Games bronze medallists for Australia
People from New South Wales
Commonwealth Games medallists in field hockey
Medallists at the 2002 Commonwealth Games